Georg Burmester (4 December 1864, Barmen - 30 June 1936, Heikendorf) was a German Impressionist painter.

Life and work
He was born to Adolf Burmester, Director of the local Realschule, and Charlotte Henriette Marie née Ritter. From 1881 to 1883, he studied at the Kunstakademie Düsseldorf with Heinrich Lauenstein and Hugo Crola. He then transferred to the Academy of Fine Arts, Karlsruhe, where his primary instructor was Gustav Schönleber. 

In 1886, he made a study trip to Italy then, from 1887 to 1888, performed his mandatory military service. After completing his studies, in 1889, he moved to Kiel and befriended his fellow artist, .

The following year, he married Anne Nitzsch, the daughter of a Senator from Berlin, and settled in Möltenort, near Heikendorf. From there, he made study trips to Copenhagen and Norway. Together with Fritz Stoltenberg, he established an art school in 1905. He was awarded the Villa Romana Prize in 1907, and stayed in Florence for a year. 

From 1912 to 1930, he was a teacher at the Kunstakademie Kassel, and received the title of Professor in 1917. His best known student from this period was the landscape painter, .

References

Further reading 
 "Burmester, Georg". In: Ulrich Thieme (Ed.): Allgemeines Lexikon der Bildenden Künstler von der Antike bis zur Gegenwart, Volume 5 : Brewer–Carlingen. E. A. Seemann, Leipzig 1911, p.263 (Online)
 Ulrich Schulte-Wülwer: Malerei in Schleswig-Holstein. Katalog der Gemäldesammlung des Städtischen Museums Flensburg. Boyens, Heide 1989, 
 Ulrich Schulte-Wülwer: Kieler Künstler. Band 2: Kunstleben in der Kaiserzeit 1871–1918. Boyens, Heide 2016, pp.324–338
 Ingo Kroll and Sabine Behrens, Georg Burmester Werkverzeichnis, Heikendorf Art Museum, 2011

External links 

 More works by Burmester @ ArtNet
 
 "Georg Burmester" @ the Gothmund Artists' Colony website; with a portrait of Burmester by Ernst Eitner.

1864 births
1936 deaths
German painters
German landscape painters
German Impressionist painters
Kunstakademie Düsseldorf alumni
Artists from Wuppertal